Preston James Ritter (April 24, 1949 – March 30, 2015) was an American drummer, drum teacher and author of drum methods.

He joined The Electric Prunes in 1966, and played on their debut studio album, The Electric Prunes, and two hit singles, before being replaced by Michael Weakley during recording of the band's second album, Underground, in 1967. He was also involved with Linda Ronstadt, The Beach Boys, and Dobie Gray.  He later worked as a DJ and as a police officer and private investigator before becoming a Christian missionary in Korea, where he taught theology. In later years he returned to Los Angeles, and taught and wrote books on drumming.

After several years of dialysis for kidney problems, including two kidney transplants, he died in 2015, at age 65.

References

External links
 Preston Ritter home page
Preston Ritter at Find a Grave

1949 births
2015 deaths
Burials at Forest Lawn Memorial Park (Hollywood Hills)
American drummers
American music educators
The Electric Prunes members